Colless is a family name and may refer to the following:

Rick Colless (born 1952), Australian politician
Donald Henry Colless (1922−2012), Australian entomologist